La Belle Epoque is a barge of the Belgian spits category. She was built in 1930 to carry (mainly) timber. Renovated in 1995, she operates as a hotel barge on the Burgundy Canal in central France.

History

La Belle Epoque was built in the Netherlands in 1930, her original name being Savornin Lohmann and the original owner was Leendert Kruijt. When World War II broke out, the Kruijt family moved with their barge to France and started carrying timber along the canals and rivers of France. The timber from the Morvan pine forests was floated in rafts down the upper reaches of the river Yonne to Clamecy on the Nivernais Canal. Trimmed lumber was loaded here and shipped to Paris and beyond as far as Berlin. This trade gradually ceased and the barge's cargo-carrying days came to an end in 1993, when the Kruijts decided to sell the barge and retire. The barge escaped the destiny of many old working barges – being sold for scrap – when she was purchased in 1995 by European Waterways who renamed her La Belle Epoque and renovated her to operate as a hotel barge.

Hotel barge

La Belle Epoque undertakes cruises on the Canal de Bourgogne between Pouillenay and Tonnerre. She can carry up to 12 passengers and six crew. She is owned and operated by European Waterways.

References

External links 
 La Belle Epoque on french-waterways-com

Hotel barges
Barges of France
Hotels in France
1930 ships